Antedon is a genus of free-swimming, stemless crinoids. The genus first appeared in the fossil record in the Cretaceous period.

Characteristics

Members of this genus have no stems but have five pairs of feathery arms arising from a central concave disc. There are a number of cirri or unbranched appendages on a low, cone-shaped dorsal ossicle, a bone-like structure in the centre of the disc. The mouth and the ambulacral grooves are also on the upper surface. Clawed cirri on the lower surface provide temporary attachment to the substrate. There is great variability in the morphological features in Antedonids found in different habitats and the main distinguishing feature among the species is the number of cirri.

Species
The following species are recognised in the World Register of Marine Species:
Antedon arabica AH Clark & AM Clark
Antedon bifida (Pennant, 1777)
Antedon duebeni Böhlsche, 1866
Antedon mediterranea (Lamarck, 1816)
Antedon nuttingi (AH Clark, 1936)
Antedon parviflora (AH Clark, 1912)
Antedon petasus (Düben & Koren, 1846)

References

Antedonidae